Artashes Vardani Aznauryan (19 September 1938 – 18 November 2022) was an Armenian doctor and politician. A member of the Communist Party of the Soviet Union, he served as Minister of Health of the Armenian SSR from 1989 to 1990.

Aznauryan died on 18 November 2022, at the age of 84.

References

1938 births
2022 deaths
Armenian physicians
Communist Party of the Soviet Union members
Health ministers of Armenia
Yerevan State Medical University alumni
People from Batumi
20th-century Armenian politicians